Ulrika Margareta Knape-Lindberg (née Knape on 26 April 1955) is a retired Swedish diver. She competed in the 10 m platform and 3 m springboard at the 1972 and 1976 Olympics and won one gold and two silver medals. In 1972–1974 she was named the World Platform Diver of the Year. Domestically she won 38 Swedish titles.

Knape won the Svenska Dagbladet Gold Medal in 1972, and after retiring from competitions worked as a national diving coach. She is married to the fellow diver Mathz Lindberg; their daughter Anna Lindberg competed in diving at five Olympics.

See also
 List of members of the International Swimming Hall of Fame

References

1955 births
Living people
Swedish female divers
Olympic divers of Sweden
Divers at the 1972 Summer Olympics
Divers at the 1976 Summer Olympics
Olympic gold medalists for Sweden
Olympic silver medalists for Sweden
Olympic medalists in diving
Medalists at the 1976 Summer Olympics
Medalists at the 1972 Summer Olympics
World Aquatics Championships medalists in diving
Simavdelningen 1902 divers
Örebro University alumni
Divers from Gothenburg
20th-century Swedish women
21st-century Swedish women